Osteocephalus planiceps is a species of frog in the family Hylidae found in Colombia, Ecuador, Peru, and possibly Brazil. Its natural habitat is subtropical or tropical moist lowland forests.
It is threatened by habitat loss.

References
 Angulo, A., Coloma, L.A., Ron, S., Castro, F., Rueda, J.V., Jungfer, K.-H. & Monteza, J.I. 2004.  Osteocephalus planiceps.   2006 IUCN Red List of Threatened Species.   Downloaded on 21 July 2007.

Osteocephalus
Amphibians of Colombia
Amphibians of Ecuador
Amphibians of Peru
Taxonomy articles created by Polbot
Amphibians described in 1874